Yellow-fin may refer to one of the following species of fish:

 Yellowfin bream, several fishes in the family Sparidae
 Yellowfin croaker, a fish in the family Sciaenidae
 Yellowfin cutthroat trout, a fish in the family Salmonidae
 Yellowfin fairy-wrasse, a fish in the family Labridae
 Yellowfin grouper, a fish in the family Serranidae
 Yellowfin madtom, a fish in the family Ictaluridae
 Yellow-fin perchlet, a fish in the family Ambassidae
 Yellowfin pike, a fish in the family Dinolestidae
 Yellowfin seabream, several fishes in the family Sparidae
 Yellowfin surgeon, a fish in the family Acanthuridae
 Yellowfin tuna, a fish in the family Scombridae
 Yellowfin whiting, a fish in the family Sillaginidae

It may also refer to:
 Yellow Fin (film), a 1951 American action film

See also
 Yellow Finn